SS Ora Ellis was a Liberty ship built in the United States during World War II.

Construction
Ora Ellis was laid down on 23 July 1945, under a Maritime Commission (MARCOM) contract, MC hull 3148, by J.A. Jones Construction, Panama City, Florida; she was launched on 26 September 1945.

History
She was allocated to Polarus Steamship Co., Inc., on 16 October 1945. On 3 January 1947, she was laid up in the, National Defense Reserve Fleet, Mobile, Alabama. She was sold, on 8 August 1947, to Coral Steamship Corp., for commercial use and renamed Coral Sea. On 18 May 1960, after having been sold to Coral Cia. Armmadora, renamed Andros Coral, and flagged in Liberia, she sank for a total loss when she was grounded in the Chacao Channel, Chile.

References

Bibliography

 
 
 
 
 
 

 

Liberty ships
Ships built in Panama City, Florida
1945 ships
Mobile Reserve Fleet